Nicaragua competed at the 1976 Summer Olympics in Montreal, Quebec, Canada. Fifteen competitors, all men, took part in nineteen events in six sports.

Athletics

Men's High Jump
 Carlos Abaunza
 Qualification — NM (→ did not advance)

Boxing

Cycling

Individual road race
 David Iornos — did not finish (→ no ranking) 
 Hamblin González — did not finish (→ no ranking) 
 Manuel Largaespada — did not finish (→ no ranking) 
 Miguel Espinoza — did not finish (→ no ranking)

Team time trial
 David Iornos
 Hamblin González
 Manuel Largaespada
 Miguel Espinoza

Judo

Swimming

Weightlifting

References

External links
Official Olympic Reports

Nations at the 1976 Summer Olympics
1976
1976 in Nicaraguan sport